Kymmenegård County was a county of Sweden 1775-1809 and province of Grand Duchy of Finland 1809-1831.

The county was created in 1775 by dividing the Savolax and Kymmenegård County into two parts: Savolax and Karelia County and Kymmenegård County. Residence city was Heinola.

By the Treaty of Fredrikshamn in 1809 Sweden ceded all its territories in Finland, east of the Torne River, to Russia. Kymmenegård Province was succeeded in 1831 by the Mikkeli Province in the autonomic Grand Duchy of Finland. Minor parts of province were merged to Uusimaa Province.

Maps

Governors 

Gustaf Riddercreutz 1774–1783
Robert Wilhelm de Geer af Tervik 1783–1789
Otto Wilhelm Ramsay 1789–1792
Herman af Låstbom  1793
Otto Wilhelm Ramsay 1793
Johan Herman Lode 1793–1810
Fredrik Adolf Jägerhorn af Spurila 1810–1812
Anders Gustaf Langenskiöld 1812–1827
Adolf Broberg 1827–1828
Erik Wallenius 1828
Abraham Joakim Molander 1828–1831

Former counties of Sweden
Former provinces of Finland